Digby, the Biggest Dog in the World is a 1973 British children's fantasy-adventure comedy film starring Jim Dale, and directed by Joseph McGrath. A large supporting cast of British movie stalwarts includes Spike Milligan, Angela Douglas, Norman Rossington, Milo O'Shea, Dinsdale Landen and Victor Spinetti. The production included composer Edwin Astley and cinematographer Harry Waxman. The film was based on the 1960 novel The Biggest Dog in the World by Ted Key.

The film starred Fernville Lord Digby in the title role.  Digby was then the reigning Dulux Old English Sheepdog; the company using the breed since 1961 in their advertisements that led to the breed's popularity around the world.

Plot
Accident-prone Jeff works at a NATO research facility as an animal behaviourist. He steals a tiny amount of Project X, but an Old English Sheepdog accidentally drinks it. X is a liquid growth formula (a form of experimental fertilizer) and Digby expands to gigantic proportions.

Cast
Jim Dale - Jeff Eldon 
Angela Douglas - Janine 
Spike Milligan - Dr. Harz 
John Bluthal - Jerry 
Milo O'Shea - Dr. Jameson 
Norman Rossington - Tom 
Richard Beaumont - Billy White 
Dinsdale Landen - Colonel Masters 
Garfield Morgan - Rogerson 
Victor Spinetti - Professor Ribart 
Harry Towb - Ringmaster 
Kenneth J. Warren - General Frank 
Bob Todd - The Great Manzini 
Molly Urquhart - Aunt Ina
Frank Thornton - Estate Agent 
Victor Maddern - Dog Home Manager 
Sheila Steafel - Control Operator

Notes

External links
 

1973 films
1970s adventure comedy films
1970s fantasy comedy films
1973 independent films
British children's adventure films
British children's fantasy films
British fantasy adventure films
British independent films
1970s English-language films
Films about dogs
Films about giants
Films based on adventure novels
Films based on American novels
Films based on fantasy novels
Films directed by Joseph McGrath (film director)
Films shot at EMI-Elstree Studios
Films about size change
1970s children's adventure films
1970s children's fantasy films
1970s fantasy adventure films
1973 comedy films
1970s British films